Amblyptilia direptalis is a moth of the family Pterophoridae. It is known from Ethiopia, Kenya, South Africa, Tanzania, India and Sri Lanka.

The larvae feed on Scutellaria discolor and Teucrium quadrifarium.

References

Amblyptilia
Moths described in 1864
Plume moths of Africa
Plume moths of Asia
Moths of Africa
Moths of Asia